Georges Dansereau (December 15, 1867 – December 26, 1934) was a Canadian provincial politician. He was the Liberal member of the Legislative Assembly of Quebec for Argenteuil from 1927 until his death in 1934. He was also mayor of Grenville, Quebec, serving terms in 1910–1912, 1914, 1915, and 1933–1934. He was the father of Georges-Étienne Dansereau.

References

1867 births
1934 deaths
Mayors of places in Quebec
People from Verchères, Quebec
Quebec Liberal Party MNAs